The Phoenix Concerts is a live album released in 1974, and it is the seventh solo album by folk musician John Stewart, former member of the Kingston Trio. It was recorded live at Phoenix Symphony Hall in Phoenix, Arizona, March 1974, and it was Stewart's first live album release. It was originally released as a double album.

Track listing
All compositions by John Stewart.

Original LP release
Side one
 "Wheatfield Lady" – 2:25
 "Kansas Rain" – 2:33
 "You Can't Look Back" – 1:35
 "The Pirates of Stone County Road" – 5:30
 "The Runaway Fool of Love" – 2:18
Side two
 "Roll Away the Stone" – 2:44
 "July, You're a Woman" – 3:30
 "The Last Campaign Trilogy" [Containing "All The Brave Horses"] – 8:15
Side three
 "Oldest Living Son" – 2:50
 "Little Road and a Stone to Roll" – 2:15
 "Kansas" – 3:35
 "Cody" – 3:11
 "California Bloodlines" – 4:45
Side four
 "Mother Country" – 5:38
 "Cops" – 3.20
 "Never Goin' Back (to Nashville Anymore)" – 9:13

Addition tracks on CD release
 Freeway Pleasure -
 Let the Big Horse Run -

Personnel
 John Stewart – electric guitar, acoustic guitar
 Arnie Moore - bass
 Jonathan Douglas - organ, congas, piano
 Loren Newkirk - piano, organ
 Jim Gordon - drums
 Michael Stewart - rhythm guitar
 Dan Dugmore - pedal steel guitar, electric guitar
 Mike Settle - vocals
 Denny Brooks - vocals
 Buffy Ford - vocals

Additional personnel
 Nikolas Venet - producer
 Pete Abbott - record and remix engineer
 Eddie Brennen - remix technician
 Ken Caillat - recording crew
 Jack Crymes - recording crew
 Biff Dawes - recording crew
 Ron Monzo - road equipment manager
 Dick Goldstein - road equipment manager
 Frank Mulvey - art direction
 Elbinger & Sun - cover photo
 Fred Valentine - inside photos

References

John Stewart (musician) albums
Albums produced by Nick Venet
1974 live albums
RCA Records live albums